Leccinum areolatum is a species of bolete fungus in the family Boletaceae. Found in the United States, it was described as new to science in 1971 by mycologists Alexander H. Smith and Harry Delbert Thiers. Josef Šutara proposed a transfer to Krombholziella in 1982.

See also
List of Leccinum species
List of North American boletes

References

areolatum
Fungi described in 1971
Fungi of the United States
Taxa named by Alexander H. Smith
Fungi without expected TNC conservation status